Sir Richard Moon, 1st Baronet (1814–1899) was a railway engineer. He became chairman in June 1861 of the London and North Western Railway until he retired on 22 February 1891.

Born in Liverpool, the elder son of merchant Richard Moon (1783-1842) and his wife Elizabeth, daughter of William Bradley Frodsham, of Liverpool, Moon became a member of the board of the London and North Western Railway in 1847, the company having just come into existence as the result of the amalgamation of several lines. First becoming a director, he was appointed chairman in June 1861.

As chair, Richard Moon, being concerned with costs, concentrated locomotive construction at Crewe, and Carriage construction at Wolverton, thus enhancing the prosperity of each site.

Sir Richard also founded the Snowdon Mountain Railway in Wales, in association with George Assheton-Smith, which opened in 1896.

He lived in Bevere, a small hamlet on the banks of the River Severn, in Claines parish, Worcestershire, from 1849 to 1863. At the parish vestry meeting on 24 April 1851 he was elected as Vicar's Churchwarden. After moving to Copsewood Grange, east of Coventry, he invested in Joseph Cash's attempts to manufacture artificial silk.

Moon married Eleanor (1820-1891), daughter of John Brocklebank, of Hazelholm, Whitehaven, Cumberland, a former officer of the West Cumberland Volunteers, in 1840; they had three sons and two daughters.

Moon was created a baronet, of Copsewood Grange, in the parish Stoke, in the County of Warwick, in the Baronetage of the United Kingdom, on 22 July 1887. He was succeeded in the baronetcy by his grandson, Cecil Ernest Moon (son of Sir Richard's eldest son, Edward, who died in 1893). He is buried at St. Bartholomew's Church, Coventry.

Richard Moon Street in Crewe is named after him.

References

Sources 

1814 births
1899 deaths
British chairpersons of corporations
London and North Western Railway people
Businesspeople from Liverpool
Baronets in the Baronetage of the United Kingdom
19th-century English businesspeople